Boromir is a fictional character in J. R. R. Tolkien's legendarium. He appears in the first two volumes of The Lord of the Rings (The Fellowship of the Ring and The Two Towers), and is mentioned in the last volume, The Return of the King. He was the heir of Denethor II (the 26th Steward of Gondor) and the elder brother of Faramir. In the course of the story Boromir joined the Fellowship of the Ring.

Boromir is portrayed as a noble character who believed passionately in the greatness of his kingdom and fought indomitably for it. His great stamina and physical strength, together with a forceful and commanding personality, made him a widely admired commander in Gondor's army and the favourite of his father Denethor. As a member of the Fellowship, his desperation to save his country ultimately drove him to betray his companions and attempt to seize the Ring, but he was redeemed by his repentance and brave last stand.

Commentators have remarked Boromir's vainglory and desire for the Ring. They have compared him both to other proud Tolkien characters such as Fëanor and Túrin Turambar, and to medieval heroes like Roland, who also blew a horn in battle and was killed in the wilderness. His boat-funeral, too, has been likened to Scyld Scefing's ship-burial in Beowulf.

Boromir appears in animated and live-action films of Lord of the Rings, and in radio and television versions.

Appearances 

Boromir is the son of Denethor II and Lady Finduilas of Dol Amroth. He had a younger brother Faramir. A year after Faramir was born their father became the ruling Steward of Gondor, and Boromir became heir apparent, inheriting the Horn of Gondor. When Boromir's mother Finduilas died, he was only 10.
Denethor always favoured Boromir over Faramir; he loved Boromir "too much, perhaps; the more so because they were unlike".

In response to prophetic dreams that came to Faramir and later to himself, Boromir claimed the quest of riding to Rivendell. His journey lasted a hundred and eleven days, and he travelled through "roads forgotten" to reach Rivendell, though, as he said, "few knew where it lay". Boromir lost his horse while crossing the Greyflood and travelled the rest of the way on foot.

The Fellowship of the Ring 

In The Fellowship of the Ring, Boromir arrived at Rivendell just as the Council of Elrond was commencing. There he told of Gondor's attempts to keep the power of Mordor at bay. He attempted to persuade the Council to let him take the One Ring to defend Gondor, but was told that it would corrupt and destroy its user, and alert Sauron to its presence. He accepted this for the moment. He agreed to accompany Aragorn to Gondor's capital, Minas Tirith, and since their path lay with the Fellowship for the first part of the journey, he pledged to protect the Ring-bearer, Frodo.

Boromir accompanied the Fellowship south from Rivendell. Before departing, he sounded the Horn of Gondor, saying he "would not go forth like a thief into the night". On the journey south, he questioned the wisdom of their leader Gandalf. On the Fellowship's attempt to pass over the Misty Mountains, he advised that firewood be collected before the attempt to climb Caradhras, saving them from freezing in a blizzard. In the retreat from Caradhras, Boromir proved his strength as he and Aragorn forced a way through shoulder-high snowbanks back down the mountain.

The Fellowship then passed under the mountains through the caverns of Moria where Gandalf was killed, and Aragorn became their new guide. At the borders of the Elven realm of Lothlórien, Boromir was unnerved by the thought of entering, pleading with Aragorn to find another way "though it led through a hedge of swords"; he cited stories of elvish witchcraft, and the "strange paths" they had already taken which had caused Gandalf's death. Once in Lórien, Boromir was greatly disturbed by Galadriel's testing of his mind, telling Aragorn "not to be too sure of this lady and her purposes". On parting, Galadriel gave Boromir a golden belt and an Elven-cloak.

Boromir had always planned to go to Minas Tirith, and despite the consensus reached at Rivendell that the Ring must be destroyed in Mordor, he urged the Fellowship to accompany him to Minas Tirith before going on to Mordor. As Frodo pondered his course from Parth Galen, Boromir privately urged him to use the Ring in Gondor's defence, rather than to "throw it away". Finally, he succumbed to the temptation to take the Ring for himself, justifying this by his duty to his people and his belief in his own integrity.

After seeing that Frodo was unconvinced, Boromir half begged, half commanded him to at least lend the Ring, and when Frodo still refused, Boromir leaped to seize it. Frodo vanished by putting on the Ring and fled, intending to continue the quest alone. Boromir, realizing his betrayal, immediately repented of his actions and wept. Searching unsuccessfully for Frodo, he told the Fellowship of Frodo's disappearance, though not of his own misdeeds. The hobbits in a frenzy scattered to look for Frodo.  Aragorn, suspecting Boromir's part in Frodo's flight, ordered him to follow and protect Merry and Pippin. The Fellowship was then attacked by a band of orcs.

The Two Towers 

Fighting to defend Merry and Pippin, Boromir was mortally wounded by orc-arrows. In Pippin's words:

Blasts from Boromir's horn alerted Aragorn, but he came too late to prevent the hobbits' capture. As Boromir lay dying, he remorsefully confessed to attempting to take the Ring from Frodo. He urged Aragorn to save Minas Tirith, as he himself has failed. Aragorn reassured him that he had not failed, that indeed "few have gained such a victory". Aragorn, Gimli, and Legolas placed Boromir's body in one of their Elven boats, with his sword, belt, cloak, broken horn, and the weapons of his slain foes about him. They set the boat adrift in the river toward the Falls of Rauros, singing the "Lament of the Winds" as his funeral song.

Three days later, Faramir, to his and their father's great grief, saw the boat bearing his dead brother floating down the River.

Names and titles 

Boromir is the son and heir apparent of Denethor, the ruling Steward of Gondor. Appendix A calls him "Captain of the White Tower", while Faramir called him "High Warden of the White Tower" and "our Captain-General".

Boromir was described by Tolkien as a name "of mixed form"; it combines Sindarin bor(on)- 'steadfast' and Quenya míre 'jewel'. But the Stewards of Gondor also often bore names "remembered in the songs and histories of the First Age", regardless of meaning, and the name Boromir did appear during the First Age in The Silmarillion. The eleventh steward of Gondor, Denethor I, had as well a son called Boromir who was described as a great warrior. This might have been an inspiration for Denethor II to name his first son.

Interpretation

Morality 

Boromir's desire for the Ring has been described as well-intentioned but uninformed by the potential danger. His perception of Middle-earth is biased by a belief that divine powers have chosen Gondor to lead the fight against evil. He is always eager to praise the great deeds of Gondor, including his own. Boromir's hubris makes him prey to the malign power of the Ring, and he seals his own doom when he attacks Frodo to seize it. He makes way thereby for Aragorn to become the future king of Gondor, in a manner similar to Virgil's character Turnus. He speaks of using the Ring in the service of Gondor, but his talk of "strength in a just cause" indicates, writes the Tolkien critic Tom Shippey, only how matters would begin. He comments that Boromir never quite says "the end justifies the means", though the thought makes his corrupted behaviour entirely believable.

In Christian terms, Boromir atones for his assault on Frodo by single-handedly but vainly defending Merry and Pippin from orcs, which illustrates the Catholic theme of the importance of good intention, especially at the point of death. This is clear from Gandalf's statement: "But he [Boromir] escaped in the end.... It was not in vain that the young hobbits came with us, if only for Boromir's sake."

Boromir has been likened to other Tolkien characters such as Fëanor or Túrin Turambar who display vainglorious excess, a trait in leaders that Tolkien despised. The character of Boromir has been compared to the legendary medieval hero Roland. Both blow a horn in the distress of battle and both are eventually killed in the wilderness while defending their companions, although Roland is portrayed as blameless and heroic throughout. Further, Roland's death gives the appearance of signalling the end of the ruling dynasty.

Boat-funeral 

The ship-burials of the seafaring Numenoreans in The Lost Road and Other Writings have been compared to those of the Viking age as described in the Prose Edda and in the Old English poem Beowulf; Boromir is similarly given a boat-funeral. As with Scyld Scefing's funeral ship in Beowulf, no-one knows where the boat goes to in the end, but for Tolkien the suggestion that it goes to a mysterious land in the uttermost West was fascinating, and he developed it at length in The Lost Road.

Portrayal in adaptations 

In both Ralph Bakshi's 1978 animated film and in the subsequent BBC Radio serial, Boromir is played by Michael Graham Cox. 

Boromir is played by Carl-Kristian Rundman in the 1993 Finnish miniseries Hobitit.

In Peter Jackson's The Lord of the Rings film trilogy, Boromir is played by Sean Bean. His line "One does not simply walk into Mordor" became famous enough for Bean to comment that the "one does not simply" meme (with variant endings) would "probably be my unintended legacy". In a departure from the structure of Tolkien's book, Boromir's death is shown at the end of The Fellowship of the Ring (2001), instead of being related at the beginning of The Two Towers.

In The Two Towers (2002), Boromir appears in the theatrical version only briefly during the beginning flashback sequence of Gandalf's fight with the Balrog in Moria.  The Extended Edition adds two additional flashbacks: first when Faramir remembers finding Boromir's body and his cloven horn in the elven boat washed up on shore; and in longer flashback (the only scene of the film trilogy where Boromir and Faramir are seen speaking to each other), after Boromir's victory in Osgiliath and before his departure for Rivendell. The two brothers are seen celebrating and laughing before their father interrupts, asking him to go to Rivendell to seek the One Ring. Here Boromir apparently knows that "Isildur's Bane" is the One Ring, and he is chosen by his father, despite his reluctance to go, in response to a summons from Elrond.

In The Return of the King (2003), Boromir appears in the theatrical version during a brief flashback as Pippin remembers his heroic self-sacrifice. In the Extended Edition of the film, Boromir appears briefly when Denethor looks at Faramir and imagines for a moment that he sees Boromir walking towards him, smiling.

References

Primary 
This list identifies each item's location in Tolkien's writings.

Secondary

Sources 

 
 
 
 
 
 

The Lord of the Rings characters
Fictional military captains
Literary characters introduced in 1954
Fictional generals
Fictional nobility
Middle-earth Dúnedain
Fictional swordfighters

de:Figuren in Tolkiens Welt#Boromir
simple:Middle-earth characters#Boromir